Pontivivens is a Gram-negative and aerobic genus of bacteria from the family of Rhodobacteraceae with one known species (Pontivivens insulae). Pontivivens insulae has been isolated from seawater from the Geoje Island in Korea.

References

Rhodobacteraceae
Bacteria genera
Monotypic bacteria genera